The following three sortable tables list land surface elevation extremes by region.

Elevation is the vertical distance above the reference geoid, an equipotential gravitational surface model of the Earth's sea level.


Table of elevation extremes by geographic region

Table of elevation extremes by geographic zone

Table of elevation extremes by geographic hemisphere

Gallery

See also
List of elevation extremes by country
Geodesy
Geoid
Nadir
Summit
Topographic elevation
Topographic isolation
Topographic prominence
:Category:Highest points
:Category:Lowest points

Notes

References

External links

United Kingdom
Foreign and Commonwealth Office
Country profiles
United States of America
The Library of Congress
Country Studies
U.S. Central Intelligence Agency
The World Factbook
U.S. Department of State
Background Notes

Elevation Extremes By Region, List Of
Elevation Extremes By Region, List Of
Elevation Extremes By Region, List Of
Elevation by region